The Hôtel de la Capitainerie des Chasses (lit. 'Hunting Master's Office Hotel') is a hôtel particulier and Historic Monument in Villejuif in the Val-de-Marne department, France.

History
The hotel was built around 1762 for Jacques Alexandre Gauthier de Vinfrais, hunting inspector of the Varenne du Louvre bailiwick and commander of the Gendarmerie brigade at Villejuif. Vinfrais sold out the hotel in 1797.

His son-in-law, the deputy Thomas de Treil de Pardailhan, resided there from 1782 to 1795.

In 1834, the hôtel particulier was split into three separate buildings. The facade was altered around 1834.

In the early 19th century, the Villejuif city council decided to locate its municipal garage there, later replaced by the municipal technical center.

The facades, the roof, the coachway and the central staircase of the building were listed as a Historic Monument on September 17, 1996.

References

Hôtels particuliers
Buildings and structures completed in the 18th century
1760s establishments in France
Buildings and structures in Val-de-Marne
Monuments historiques of Île-de-France
18th-century architecture in France